Blabbermouth.net is a website dedicated to heavy metal and hard rock news, as well as album and music DVD reviews. Blabbermouth.net was founded and is run by Borivoj Krgin. The first version of the website was launched in March 2001; in October 2001, the record label Roadrunner Records began hosting it.

Users can post comments to selected news articles and album reviews, either in response to other user comments or in response to the article itself.

History
Founder Borivoj Krgin came up with the concept of Blabbermouth in January 2000. Robert Kampf, a friend of Krgin who runs Century Media Records, was staying with Krgin in New York and set up a meeting with Gunter Ford of World Management. During the meeting, Ford suggested an idea for a "heavy metal portal", a site which would offer news, merchandise, and CD reviews to get record labels to sell their products through the site. Ford wanted Kampf to be involved. Krgin disliked the idea and wished for a site that offered around-the-clock news, as he thought that no good news sites existed.

Krgin began researching how to develop and host his own website two months after the meeting. After a year Krgin felt comfortable going "live". The initial "primitive" version of the site was launched on March 3, 2001. In October of the same year Monte Conner, a friend of Krgin, and a Roadrunner Records A&R approached Krgin with the idea of having the site hosted on the Roadrunner servers. This way, Krgin could focus on Blabbermouth.net's content rather than the technical aspects involved in running a site.

Blabbermouth.net is described by the London Free Press as a "reliable industry and fan site".

Sources
According to his own words, Krgin spends most of his time operating the site. When finding information relating to bands, Krgin claims to search bands' official websites (including social networking sites), which are usually reported on immediately, and band message boards where members of the band post. However, Krgin relies on the contacts he has made over the years ranging from band members, metal journalists, managers and other people in the music industry, stating this is where the "best" information comes from.

Krgin supposedly sends e-mails and makes telephone calls daily to obtain new information. Blabbermouth.net has a 'submit news' feature which has proved to be helpful to Krgin. When receiving a rumor he deems worthy of posting, Krgin will first research and contact people related to the band and question them about the rumour. It's claimed that 90% of the information posted is either found online or is submitted directly to the website by bands, managers, labels or associated persons.

Criticism
Blabbermouth.net has been criticized by musicians and music industry persons for internet trolls and news posts that are unrelated to heavy metal or hard rock. Krgin said he posts these articles to attract humorous comments from users, and as relief from the constant monotony of album news.

In September 2006, Krgin claimed to have performed a cleanup of Blabbermouth.net's comments and to have adopted a policy whereby users can report offensive comments in order to have them deleted from the site. Prior to this, in his own words, "countless abusive, obscene, defamatory, racist, homophobic and threatening comments" had been posted on the site since the "comments" feature was implemented in early 2002.

Traffic

Blabbermouth.net was visited by more than 1.2 million unique users each month, and it had an average of 80,000 unique visitors per day, according to Google Analytics (as of August 2011). The busiest day so far was 298,000 unique visitors in a single 24-hour period over May 16, 2010, due to the death of Ronnie James Dio. The second-busiest day was more than 200,000 unique visitors in a single 24-hour period, which happened the day after the death of Type O Negative frontman Peter Steele—April 15, 2010.

Blabbermouth.net is ranked as the 12,279th-most-trafficked website globally according to Alexa.

Prior to its recent change requiring users to log in with a Facebook account in order to post comments, Blabbermouth.net had more 101,000 registered users (users who are registered to post comments on the site) as of August 2011.

References

External links

Heavy metal publications
American entertainment news websites
Internet properties established in 2001
2001 establishments in the United States